Dabat (Amharic: ዳባት) is a woreda in Amhara Region, Ethiopia. Part of the Semien Gondar Zone, Dabat is bordered on the south by Wegera, on the west by Tach Armachiho, on the northwest by Tegeda, and on the northeast by Debarq. Towns in Dabat include Dabat and Wekin.

The highest peak in Dabat is also the highest peak in Ethiopia: Mount Ras Dashan. It is a member of the Semien Mountains, which cover most of this woreda. Due to its inaccessibility and the lack of the most basic infrastructure, in 1999 the Regional government classified Dabat as one of its 47 drought prone and food insecure woredas. Both Dabat and Wekin lie on the Gondar-Debarq highway.

Demographics
Based on the 2007 national census conducted by the Central Statistical Agency of Ethiopia (CSA), this woreda has a total population of 145,509, an increase of 22.72% over the 1994 census, of whom 73,852 are men and 71,657 women; 15,821 or 10.87% are urban inhabitants. With an area of 1,187.93 square kilometers, Dabat has a population density of 122.49, which is greater than the Zone average of 63.76 persons per square kilometer. A total of 31,111 households were counted in this woreda, resulting in an average of 4.68 persons to a household, and 30,293 housing units. The majority of the inhabitants practiced Ethiopian Orthodox Christianity, with 97.7% reporting that as their religion, while 2.4% of the population said they were Muslim.

The 1994 national census reported a total population for this woreda of 118,566 in 21,599 households, of whom 60,020 were men and 58,546 women; 10,991 or 9.27% of its population were urban dwellers at the time. The largest ethnic group reported in Dabat was the Amhara (99.44%); all other ethnic groups made up 0.56% of the population. Amharic was spoken as a first language by 99.59%; the remaining 0.41% spoke all other primary languages reported. 97.13% practiced Ethiopian Orthodox Christianity, and 2.79% of the population said they were Muslim.

References

Districts of Amhara Region